Common Grounds is a six-issue comic book limited series created by writer Troy Hickman and published by Top Cow Productions in 2004.  The series examined the life of superheroes and villains in and around a chain of coffee shops called Common Grounds.

Common Grounds received two Eisner Award nominations in 2005, for "Best Short Story" and "Best Anthology."

Overview
The series began in 1994 as the black-and-white mini-comic, Holey Crullers, written by Hickman and drawn by Jerry Smith. It was circulated through mail order and direct sales at comic book conventions with small print runs. In 1997, Wizard magazine covered it in a four-page article.

In 2003, Wizard editor Jim McLauchlin became editor-in-chief of Top Cow Productions. He contacted Hickman about getting the rights to the Holey Crullers scripts. In early 2004, Common Grounds was launched as a six-issue limited series featuring Hickman's stories and new artwork by Dan Jurgens, George Pérez, Mike Oeming, Chris Bachalo, Sam Kieth, Angel Medina, Carlos Pacheco, and Ethan Van Sciver. Jurgens was the regular artist, providing art for one short story every issue, while one of the guest artists provided the art for additional stories.

The series received critical acclaim. In November 2007, a trade paperback was published collecting all six issues.  In 2005, it was nominated for Eisner Awards in the categories "Best Anthology" and "Best Short Story" for Where Monsters Dine.

Title
The original 1990s comic series, Holey Crullers, centered on a chain of doughnut shops named "Holey Crullers".  The name was a word-play on a type of doughnut, a cruller with a hole in the center, that paid homage to the regular  outbursts of Robin in the 1960s era Batman.

The decision to update the doughnut shops to coffee shops and change the name to Common Grounds was an attempt to be more relevant to the coffee culture in the US in the late 1990s and early 2000s. As with the previous title, the name "Common Grounds" includes some word play by referencing a safe, neutral haven for opposing viewpoints and an important aspect of coffee.

The series includes an in-story reference to the name change in issue six. The company founder explains that he wanted to call his chain "Holey Crullers", but received a letter from the lawyers of the "old 60s superhero tv show" in which the sidekick always says "Holy This" and "Holy That".

Characters
Ed Franklin
Gerald Smith, a.k.a. Speeding Bullet
Gabriel "Gabe" Alexander, a.k.a. Mental Midget
Robert Louis Dupree, a.k.a. Man-Witch
Jenny Saunders
"John" the serial rapist
Tim Lesley, a.k.a. Analog Kid
Chris Lesley, a.k.a. Digital Man
Patricia Van Buren, a.k.a. Deb-U-Ton
Moshe Chomsky, a.k.a. The Acidic Jew
Sam Henderson, a.k.a. Strangeness
Clarise Henderson, a.k.a. Charm
"Thorny" Thorndyke
Benjamin Bellott, a.k.a. Commander Power
James McLain, a.k.a. Blackwatch
The Superheavyweights
Susan LaBelle, a.k.a. Knockout
Red Fox II
Miniaturian
Coldspell
Hi-Tec
The Liberty Balance
Earl Lumley, a.k.a. Lift-Off
Gail Milgrim, a.k.a. Belle-Air
The Flaming Follicle
Mach Master
Magna-Woman
Captain Gallant
The Eternal Flame
Lea Anne Lyster, a.k.a. Kittycat
Jeff Bailey, a.k.a. Big Money II
Larry the delivery guy
Grondar
Crittorr
Kkrapp
Wang Dang Doodle
Claire Grant, a.k.a. American Pi
Zhang
Stevie Parsons
Michael O'Brien, a.k.a. Big Money

Stories

1 Rodolfo Migliari made the alternate cover for Issue #1.2 Issue #4's cover art was inspired by Edward Hopper's "Nighthawks" painting.

Collected Editions
The series has been collected in a trade paperback that includes:
Cover and Pinup Gallery1
Common Grounds Timeline
Holey Crullers Bonus Material
Liberty Balance Pinup by George Pérez, Mike Perkins and Tom Smith

Notes
1 Includes Issue #1's alternate cover by Rodolfo Migliari and a pinup by James Raiz, Roland Paris and Sonia Oback depicting various superheroes battling Crittorr and Wang Dang Doodle.

References

External links
TopCow.com - Top Cow Productions, Inc. website
TheTopCowStore.com - Top Cow Productions, Inc. store

Minicomics
2004 comics debuts